Avraham Abutbul (January 2, 1961 – October 11, 2012) was an Israeli actor and singer.

Biography

Early life
Abutbul was born in Kiryat Ata, Israel, to an Mizrahi Jewish family from Egypt and Algeria. When he was 17 years old, he moved to Jerusalem and attended the yeshiva Ohr Somayach, which he later left when he abandoned Orthodox Judaism.

Acting career
Abutbul made his film debut in the 1986 film Every Time We Say Goodbye starring Tom Hanks. His most prominent film appearance in the 2004 film Ushpizin in which he portrayed Ben Baruch and in the 1990 film Front Window. He made his earliest television appearance in 1997 and he also appeared in the 2004 suspense series Timrot Ashan.

Music career
In 1995, Abutbul recorded his debut album. Many of his music was centred around his religious beliefs and he made numerous film and music collaborations with Shuli Rand and the band Izabo including fellow musicians Tamir Muskat and Ronit Shahar. He recorded four studio albums and his last one was released posthumously.

Personal life
Abutbul was the older brother of actor Alon Abutbul and appeared in several films with him. He also had four children with a woman whom he divorced in the 1990s and remarried several days before his death.

Abutbul was a devout follower of Hasidic Judaism and he has portrayed many characters in films who worship the same religion.

Death
In 2012, a tumor was discovered in Abutbul's brain. He had surgery to remove it but the tumor was metastasic and the cancer spread around his body. He spent his final moments in the Hadassah Ein Karem Hospital where he died on October 11 at the age of 51.

Abutbul was interred at Mount of Olives Jewish Cemetery.

References

External links

1961 births
2012 deaths
People from Kiryat Ata
Israeli male film actors
Israeli male television actors
20th-century Israeli male singers
Hasidic singers
20th-century Israeli male actors
21st-century Israeli male actors
21st-century Israeli male singers
Deaths from brain cancer in Israel
Israeli people of Algerian-Jewish descent
Israeli people of Egyptian-Jewish descent
20th-century Israeli Jews
21st-century Israeli Jews
Jewish Israeli male actors
Jewish Israeli musicians
Israeli Mizrahi Jews
Israeli Sephardi Jews
Burials at the Jewish cemetery on the Mount of Olives